Antonio Alcázar Alonso (2 May 1902 - 6 December 1966) was a Spanish footballer who played as a left winger. He was the first footballer born in Murcia to have played for the Spain national team. A historical member of CE Europa in the 1920s, he was one of the first footballers to play for Europa for his entire career, and thus to be part of the so-called one-club men group.

Club career
Born in Murcia, but when he was barely a year old his parents moved to Barcelona. He started playing football as a child with his friends in a neighborhood team called Neptuno. His virtues did not go unnoticed by the scouts of the time, and therefore, he was already competing against the best teams in Catalonia at 16-17. He spent all of his career with CE Europa, a team from Catalonia, which in the 1920s rivaled FC Barcelona for the supremacy of Catalan football, and in fact, both teams finished tied on 17 points in the 1922-23 Catalan Championship, which meant that the title had to be decided in a playoff match that was held on 21 March 1923 at the Girona stadium, and the game was decided by a lonely goal from Alcázar. Europa’s victory over Barcelona was an extraordinary event that exceeded all expectations. Together with Mauricio, Pellicer and Cros, he formed the great attacking front of the CE Europa side that won the Catalan Championship in 1923 and then reached the 1923 Copa del Rey Final, where they were beaten by Athletic Bilbao 0-1.

International career
Being a CE Europa, he was eligible to play for the Catalan national team, receiving 7 caps, but failing to score a single goal. Alcázar also earned two caps for the Spain national team, which made him the first footballer born in Murcia to reach the national team as well as the first footballer from CE Europa. He made his debut on 1 June 1925 against Switzerland, helping his side to a 3-0 win, and in his second and last cap for Spain two weeks later, on 14 June, he contributed to a 1-0 victory over Italy at the Mestalla Stadium in Valencia. Coincidence or not, all of those 4 goals were scored by the same player Juan Errazquin.

Honours

Club
CE Europa

Catalan football championship:
Champions (1): 1922-23

Copa del Rey:
Runner-up (1): 1923

References

1902 births
1966 deaths
Footballers from Murcia
Spanish footballers
Association football midfielders
CE Europa footballers
Spain international footballers
Catalonia international footballers